The Red Synagogue of Joniškis is a former synagogue in Joniškis, Lithuania. Located next to White Synagogue of Joniškis.

History 
In 1797 the permit to build a synagogue in Joniškis was granted. Synagogue completed in 1865.

After World War II, the synagogue was converted into warehouse, later on into gym.

Current state 
In 1997 building listed in Protected Cultural Objects list.

The Red Synagogue of Joniškis was renovated and re-opened to the public in 2011.

See also
Lithuanian Jews

References 

Synagogues in Joniškis
Synagogues completed in 1865
1865 in Lithuania